National Highway 136, commonly referred to as NH 136, is a national highway of India. It comes under Ministry of Road Transport and Highways, Government of India. It is a secondary route of National Highway 36.  NH-136 traverses the state of Tamil Nadu in India.

Route 
Thanjavur, Thiruvaiyaru, Kunnam, Pereli, Perambalur bypass, Esanai, Veppanthattai, Krishnapuram, Veeraganur, Thedavur, Naduvalur, Attur bypass.

Junctions 

  Terminal near Thanjavur.
  near Keezhapalur.
  near Perambalur.
  Terminal near Attur.

See also 

 List of National Highways in India
 List of National Highways in India by state

References

External links 

 NH 136 on OpenStreetMap

National highways in India
National Highways in Tamil Nadu